Operation Gideon was an unsuccessful attempt by Venezuelan dissidents and an American private military company, Silvercorp USA, to infiltrate Venezuela by sea and remove Nicolás Maduro from office in Venezuela. The plan involved entering the country by boat into Macuto port from 3 to 4 May 2020 in order to take control of Simón Bolívar International Airport in Maiquetia, capture Maduro and other high-level figures in his government, and expel them from the country. The operation had been infiltrated by officials of the Maduro government early on. Commentators and observers, including Guaidó officials who initially contacted Silvercorp, described the operation as amateurish, underfunded, poorly-planned, having little or no chance of success, and a suicide mission.

The operation occurred in the broader context of an ongoing international dispute beginning in January 2019 over the identity of the legitimate president of Venezuela; Nicolás Maduro or Juan Guaidó. Throughout 2019, Maduro had maintained control of Venezuela's military agencies and key governmental institutions. The state intelligence agencies, as well as the Associated Press, had prior knowledge of the plot, which was intercepted before the first boat reached land.

The attack went forward despite its impracticality, with Silvercorp founder Jordan Goudreau possibly motivated by a multi-million dollar reward offered by the United States to arrest or assist with the arrest of Maduro and his high-ranking officials in connection with federal indictments filed in late March 2020 alleging involvement in drug-trafficking activity. The raid involved two fiberglass motorboats owned by Silvercorp which launched from eastern Colombia toward the Caribbean coast of Venezuela north of Caracas. The boats were carrying approximately 60 Venezuelan dissidents and two American former Green Berets employed as mercenaries by Silvercorp. Eight Venezuelan dissidents were killed and seventeen invaders were captured, including the two American security contractors, whose interrogations were broadcast on state television in the hours following the event.

After the attack, it became public that a formal document setting out the objective of the operation was signed in October 2019 between Silvercorp and Guaidó's Strategy Committee, which Guaidó had formed with the goal of exploring all available options for removing Maduro from power and installing himself as president. Guaidó's Strategy Committee withdrew from the agreement and cut off ties with Silvercorp and Goudreau in November 2019. Juan Guaidó, his Strategy Committee, and officials of the Colombian and United States governments have all denied any role in the actual attack that went forward on 3 May 2020.

Background 

A power struggle concerning who is the legitimate president of Venezuela began in January 2019, when Juan Guaidó, president of the opposition-majority National Assembly, declared that incumbent Nicolás Maduro's 2018 re-election was invalid; that the office of the president of Venezuela was therefore vacant; and that he was assuming office as acting president of the nation. Guaidó was officially recognized as the legitimate president of Venezuela by almost 60 governments internationally, including the governments of the United States and Canada; Colombia, Brazil, and the majority of Latin American countries; and the United Kingdom, France, Germany, and Spain, among other European countries. Other nations, including Russia, China, South Africa, Iran, Syria, Cuba, Nicaragua, North Korea and Turkey, continued to recognize Maduro as the legitimate head of state.

Planning
Operation Gideon was primarily planned by Clíver Alcalá Cordones and Jordan Goudreau.

Alcalá was a Major General in the Venezuelan Army until he defected in 2013 and began gathering other defectors in Colombia, stationing them in the La Guajira Peninsula. Alcalá was sanctioned in September 2011 by the United States Department of the Treasury for allegedly helping FARC obtain weapons and smuggle drugs.

Goudreau served in the Canadian Armed Forces after attending the University of Calgary from 1994 to 1998, where he studied computer science. He later moved to Washington, D.C. and enlisted in the United States Army a few months prior to the September 11 attacks in New York City, eventually reaching the rank of Sergeant first class in the 10th Special Forces Group. He became a naturalized US citizen and retired at the age of 40 due to injuries. In 2018, Goudreau founded Silvercorp USA, with the initial idea being "to embed counter-terror agents in schools disguised as teachers". Goudreau is reported to have provided security at a political rally for Donald Trump in Charlotte, North Carolina in October 2018 based on material on the Silvercorp website and Instagram account. In February 2019, Silvercorp provided security services at Venezuela Aid Live, resulting in Goudreau turning his attention to Venezuela. According to Goudreau's friend and business partner, Drew White, he saw a business opportunity in the Trump administration's intensified efforts to remove Maduro from power. White distanced himself from Silvercorp and Goudreau when Goudreau began discussing launching a military operation in Venezuela.

Initial promotion 
Through connections within the private security community, Goudreau was acquainted with Keith Schiller, the longtime director of security for Donald Trump. Schiller brought Goudreau to a March 2019 fundraising event focused on security in Venezuela, which took place at the University Club of Washington, DC. , the director of humanitarian aid for Guaidó's government, was also in attendance.

After an unsuccessful uprising attempt against Maduro supported by Guaidó on 30 April 2019, some troops who sided with Guaidó subsequently took refuge in Colombia. According to the Associated Press, weeks later, Lester Toledo introduced Goudreau to Major General Clíver Alcalá Cordones at JW Marriott Bogotá, where groups of opposition politicians and dissident soldiers held conferences on strategies for accomplishing the removal of Maduro from power. During the two-day meeting with Toledo and Goudreau, Alcalá disclosed that he had recruited some 300 men currently stationed in training camps on the Guajira Peninsula near Riohacha, Colombia, ready to carry out "a 'mad plan' to push across the western border, take the oil center of Maracaibo and force their way to Caracas, the capital". Goudreau indicated that instead of 300 as Alcalá promised, there were only 60 trainees. Goudreau proposed an alternative approach, suggesting that his company, Silvercorp, could train and equip the soldiers for a rapid strike at a cost of US$1.5 million. Goudreau bragged about having contacts with Trump administration officials, though he did not provide support for his statements.

In May 2019, Keith Schiller and Goudreau met with Guaidó administration officials in Miami, Florida, where Goudreau promoted the idea of providing security for Guaidó officials. Schiller disassociated himself from Goudreau following the meeting, believing that Goudreau was incapable of providing the services he was offering.

Colombia 

In June 2019, Alcalá met with the National Intelligence Directorate of Colombia asking for support, saying Goudreau was a former CIA agent. However, the Colombians' CIA contacts in Bogotá reportedly denied that Goudreau had ever been a CIA agent. US officials learned of the militants in Colombia and discussed a plan to organize them to assist victims of the Venezuelan refugee crisis, thus diverting them from illegal activities. When reports emerged that they might be used for an armed operation, one anonymous US official described the notion as "completely insane".

By 16 June 2019, Goudreau had compiled a list of required equipment, according to former United States Navy SEAL Ephraim Mattos, who met with Alcalá's troops while working in Colombia. The list included "320 M4 assault rifles, an anti-tank rocket launcher, Zodiac boats, US$1 million in cash and state-of-the-art night vision goggles". The trainees reportedly believed they had the backing of the U.S. government.

General Services Agreement 

In August 2019, Guaidó established a Strategic Committee and named J. J. Rendón as the General Strategist. The Strategic Committee was tasked with exploring possibilities and testing scenarios for the removal of Maduro from office, with methods ranging from increased international condemnation of Maduro to armed action. In August 2019, shortly after the formation of Guaidó's Strategic Committee, Maduro stated there was a "plan ... to get 32 mercenaries into Venezuela to kill me and to kill Venezuelan revolutionary leaders".

Rendón stated that his orders upon being named as General Strategist were to consider every option, quoting Guaidó as "saying all options were on the table, and under the table". Among the scenarios considered by the group was the removal of Maduro by capturing him and his high-ranking officials and sending them to another country for prosecution. The Committee studied the "universal enemy" doctrine and analyzed the unsuccessful Bay of Pigs Invasion of Cuba in April 1961. The Strategic Committee adopted the position that the Venezuelan Constitution, the United Nations Convention against Transnational Organized Crime, and other treaties constituted legal justification for taking action to remove Maduro. 

Rendón told The Washington Post that the Strategic Committee had contacted numerous groups about ousting Maduro, but they demanded prices from US$500 million to US$1.5 billion. Goudreau then made contact with Rendón on 7 September 2019 at a condominium in Miami, where Goudreau made a sales pitch, proposing the capture of Maduro and his officials and their extraction from Venezuela. Goudreau offered a self-financed plan at a cheaper cost of $212.9 million, backed by future oil sales. According to a source interviewed by the PanAm Post, Goudreau said he needed a signed agreement from the interim government in order to raise funds, but the opposition representatives initially put him off. On 10 October 2019, Goudreau text messaged Rendón saying, "Washington is fully aware of your direct participation in the project and I don't want them to lose faith." Further text messages displayed Maduro's inner circle warehouses filled with US dollars; Goudreau was offered 14% of funds recovered during the operation.

A 41-page document containing various attachments of the General Services agreement was signed in Washington, D.C., on 16 October 2019, by Jordan Goudreau on behalf of Silvercorp and J. J. Rendón and Sergio Vergara on behalf of the Guaidó administration. Rendón described the agreement as a "trial balloon" and a test of what Goudreau could do that was never officially implemented. The language of the agreement of "Operation Resolution" expressly stipulated that the end objective was to forcibly remove Maduro and to install Guaidó as president of Venezuela. Within a week of signing the agreement, Goudreau reported back to the opposition that he had secured funding for the operation, but provided no proof.

In the agreement's attachments, rules of engagement (ROE) were drafted that included the protection of Venezuela's cultural sites, unless used for illicit activity, and the targeting of infrastructure and economic objectives. The ROE also designated numerous enemies: Nicolás Maduro, Diosdado Cabello, their supporters, colectivos, the Revolutionary Armed Forces of Colombia (FARC), the National Liberation Army (ELN), and Hezbollah. Also included in the agreement's ROE were riot control guidelines, permitting the use of non-lethal weapons such as rubber bullets, tear gas, shields and batons against any person who became "unruly" and attacked operatives. The contract also permitted Silvercorp to detain civilians on reasonable suspicion. The agreement also established a chain of command: Juan Guaidó as commander-in-chief, Sergio Vergara as overall project supervisor, and J. J. Rendón as chief strategy officer. The agreement was signed by Rendón, Vergara, Goudreau, and Manuel J. Retureta, a Cuban-born attorney based in Washington who signed as a witness. It has been reported that Juan Guaidó himself also signed the contract, which he and his allies have denied.

Rendón told reporters that shortly after signing the agreement, Goudreau began acting suspicious, failing to provide evidence of financial backing, the armed support of 800 men, and demanded immediate payment of the $1.5 million retainer that was due within a five-day period according to the agreement. Rendón transferred Goudreau $50,000 for "expenses" to buy more time, but the relationship between the two quickly deteriorated.

On 8 November 2019, Goudreau met Rendón at the latter's condominium, where a heated argument took place. A witness to the argument at Rendón's condominium reported that "Jordan came to the apartment very upset, complaining about the alleged breach of the agreement. He demanded payment immediately, or he would screw everything up." Witnesses also reported that Goudreau threatened to join forces with Chavista businessmen if Rendón failed to pay, referring to supporters of the regime currently in power, and warning Rendón that "Whoever pays is in charge." According to Rendón, he and other opposition officials "considered the operation dead" after this encounter in early November.

In the immediate aftermath of the incident, Goudreau provided a copy of a General Services Agreement purporting to bear the signature of Juan Guaidó himself. Guaidó and his allies have denied that Guaidó signed the document, insisting that Rendón and Vergara signed on Guaidó's behalf. The Washington Post described the dispute over who signed the contract, or what parts of the contract, saying: "Goudreau counters that the agreement – supplied in part to The Post by Goudreau, with a more complete version provided by Rendón – bound the opposition to his services and initial fee. A seven-page document provided by Goudreau carries Guaidó's signature, along with those of Rendón and fellow opposition official Sergio Vergara.  In the days following the operation, Goudreau disclosed what purported to be a copy of a contract containing Guaidó's signature, whose first and last page were missing, along with a covert recording supposedly depicting Guaidó in a video call on 16 October 2019 with Goudreau. On the recording, Guaidó purportedly says, "We are doing the right thing for our country" and "I'm about to sign." Guaidó and his allies have repeatedly insisted that Guaidó did not sign any contract with Silvercorp and never spoke with Jordan Goudreau directly or in a video or telephone call. In a statement on EVTV following the incident, Guaidó stated "That is not my signature. The dictatorship goes to great lengths to plant evidence." Guaidó's National Assembly described the document supposedly bearing his Guaidó's signature as a "false document as justification to try and kidnap and illegally detain the interim president Juan Guaidó".

Hernán Alemán, a politician from the opposition party Acción Democrática from Zulia who described Goudreau as "an extraordinary man and friend with extraordinary skills" and "even spent Christmas with Jordan, somewhere in Colombia", indicated in an interview following the event that he did not know about any details surrounding the contract or the discussions that took place in the United States.

When first asked about his contacts with Silvercorp by the AP, Rendón said that this information was confidential and that he could not confirm or deny signing a contract, even if it existed. Subsequently, Rendón stated that Guaidó had signed a "preliminary" agreement with Silvercorp. Ultimately, Rendón insisted that the document Goudreau produced was never signed by Guaidó and provided previous and subsequent agreements to The Washington Post that did not bear Guaidó's signature, saying that Guaidó knew only the rough outlines of an "exploratory plan" but grew suspicious of Goudreau based on the reports of the committee. Rendón said that "We were all having red flags, and the president was not comfortable with this."

Alcalá and Goudreau resume preparations
Goudreau and Alcalá reportedly distanced themselves from the Venezuelan opposition due to their perception that the opposition was insincere and hypocritical because of alleged secret negotiations with the Maduro government. Though Alcalá and Goudreau no longer had the support of the opposition government, they resumed their preparations to go forward with the plot. Without aid from the US government or the Guaidó administration, Goudreau and Alcalá did not have the means required for a successful operation.

By December 2019, Silvercorp had purchased a  fiberglass boat in Florida that was equipped with navigational equipment two months later. In January 2020, two other former Green Beret operators, Airan Berry and Luke Denman, arrived in Colombia. According to an article published by the PanAm Post on 26 May 2020, the three Americans traveled to Colombia on a private flight from Opa-Locka, Florida, to Barranquilla, Colombia, on 16 January 2020, arriving at approximately 10:30 a.m. The PanAm Post reported that the passenger list for the flight "included a high-ranking Venezuelan government official, Yacsy Alezandra Álvarez Mirabal, who, according to OpenCorporates, is the director of Lubricantes VENOCO de Centroamérica, a Venezuelan state-owned company attached to PDVSA."

In March 2020, Goudreau traveled to Jamaica in the Silvercorp-owned fiberglass boat where he met with former special forces friends and discussed Operation Gideon. According to Jack Murphy, self-identified as a former US Ranger, the CIA learned about the plan and warned Silvercorp not to go through with it on numerous occasions. The Wall Street Journal reported that the planned operation was "widely known to former Venezuelan soldiers who considered participating, Venezuelan opposition figures, senior Colombian intelligence officials and even the CIA, which monitored their activities in La Guajira, said the people with knowledge of the plans."

Speaking after the attack, Goudreau stated the operation was forced to rely on "donations from Venezuelan migrants driving for car share service Uber in Colombia" because he was not paid by Guaidó's team. Goudreau reportedly told the AP that "It's almost like crowdfunded the liberating of a country".

When asked why his troops would land at one of Venezuela's most fortified coastlines, twenty miles from Caracas and next to the country's biggest airport, he cited as inspiration the Battle of Gaugamela, won by Alexander the Great, who had "struck deep into the heart of the enemy".

In an interview after the operation, Hernán Alemán stated that Rendón never financed the operation and that he and Alcalá undertook the operation with Goudreau without his party's knowledge.  According to Alemán, he and Alcalá took it upon themselves to finance the operation.  Alemán said that at its peak, the group consisted of four camps occupied by 150 militants.

In the weeks leading up to the attack, many militants reportedly began to abandon the operation when Goudreau's promises failed to materialize and due to rumors that Maduro had infiltrated the operation.

Alemán said the operation was compromised and had been infiltrated, saying that after Alcalá's arrest, the operation's control was transferred to other people, there was no contact with the new leaders, and the rest of the mercenaries supposedly still in hiding in Venezuela have said Captain Antonio Sequea was a mole.

Extradition of Alcalá to the United States 

A shipment of weapons and tactical gear was confiscated on 23 March 2020 by Colombian authorities tipped off by the Drug Enforcement Administration (DEA), with former DEA officials initially believing that the equipment was being sent to leftist guerrillas or criminal gangs. The impounded truck was headed for Venezuela carrying 26 semi-automatic rifles, night vision goggles, radios, and 15 combat helmets produced by High-End Defense Solutions, a company owned by Venezuelan Americans.

On 26 March 2020, the United States accused Maduro of narcoterrorism and through its Narcotics Rewards Program, offered a US$15 million reward for information leading to his arrest, plus an additional US$10 million each for information leading to the arrest of four close Maduro allies: Diosdado Cabello, Maikel Moreno, Tareck El Aissami, Vladimir Padrino López and Cilver Alcalá, one of the alleged leaders of the operation.

Alcalá assumed responsibility on 26 March for "a military operation against the Maduro dictatorship" that included the shipment of weapons captured in Colombia, stating that the United States, Colombia, and Guaidó officials had signed an agreement to overthrow Maduro. After Alcalá assumed responsibility for the weapons shipment, the Colombian attorney general announced on 28 March that an investigation into Alcalá's role in the shipment had been opened.

Guaidó denied knowledge of the event while United States Special Representative to Venezuela Elliott Abrams described Alcalá's statement as "despicable and quite dangerous". Abrams later said that Alcalá "was put up to making those terrible charges by the [Maduro] regime". Alcalá was  extradited to the United States on drug trafficking charges after voluntarily surrendering on about 27 March. The Venezuelan government said that Alcalá was a US agent and that, after the operation failed, the United States government used narcoterrorism charges as a way to transport him to the United States to prevent him from revealing more secrets.

In the context of reacting to the intercepted shipment on 26 March, Maduro stated during a press release that Alcalá was hired by the DEA to assassinate him, "but he failed because we made him fail".

According to Hernán Alemán, who admits to participating in the planning of the operation up until the point Alcalá was extradited to the United States, Sequea took control of the operation and replaced militants. Alemán remarked that Goudreau was unable to exercise command because he was in the United States. Alemán, saying he was basing his statements on mercenaries who stayed behind in the boats, accused Sequea of being a mole and of selling the militants out.

In November 2021, Alcalá's lawyers lodged a motion to have the US charges dismissed along with a statement that US officials at the highest levels of the CIA, Treasury Justice, the National Security Council and the Drug Enforcement Administration were aware of his efforts to overthrow Maduro. The statement also said J. J. Rendón and two allies of Juan Guaidó were aware of Alcalá's coup plan.

Prior knowledge of Maduro government 
Maduro's officials had advance knowledge of minute details of Goudreau and Alcalá's plans. The Washington Post wrote that Maduro "was well-informed of the effort virtually from its start." Two days after the confiscation of weapons and munitions in Colombia, on 25 March, the Venezuelan Minister of Communication and Information, Jorge Rodríguez gave a televised press conference in which he published details related to the training camps. Rodríguez named Robert Colina Ybarra, whom he identified as a murderer, as the leader of one of the training sites with the support of Colombian President Iván Duque. (Ybarra was later killed during the operation.) Rodríguez went on to mention that there were three American instructors at the training camps. "We know their cover names: agent Jordan, agent Luke, and agent Aaron", Rodríguez announced.

On 28 March, Diosdado Cabello identified Jordan Goudreau as an adviser for Alcalá during episode 294 of the show , which aired on state-owned Venezolana de Televisión. Cabello also identified by first name the two Americans who were eventually captured during the foiled plot. Cabello referred to the Americans only as "Luke" and "Aaron" [phonetic spelling] as special forces operatives allegedly training dissidents in Colombia for an armed invasion into Venezuela, without specifying their last names. Cabello also exhibited photographs purportedly showing Goudreau, Silvercorp and content from their social media profiles. The program also showed photographs from Instagram depicting Goudreau providing security services during the Venezuela Aid Live concert in Cúcuta and at a Trump rally in Charlotte. The purpose of broadcasting the images was to show that the United States was allegedly behind the international effort to remove Maduro from power and was conspiring with narcotics traffickers, referring to Alcalá. During the program, Cabello thanked "" for the information on Goudreau and the training camps in Colombia. The program also exhibited excerpts from various media organizations discussing the alleged contract between Guaidó and Silvercorp.

After news of the event broke, Maduro was explicit about the level of insider knowledge his government had, saying in his first public appearance: "We knew everything: what they were talking about, what they ate, what they drank, what they didn't drink, who financed them."

Final preparations, Associated Press article 
In the final days of April 2020, Rendón was contacted by Silvercorp's legal advisors demanding a payment of US$1.45 million, with Guaidó's officials reacting to the demands in fear, believing they were being blackmailed for money with the threat of the canceled plans being revealed to the public.

The Associated Press (AP) published an article on 1 May 2020 about Goudreau, his plan and its history, and his training camps, writing that the plans to attack Venezuela were "far-fetched" and that people who knew him believed he was "in way over his head". The article suggested that the Maduro government may have known of the plan since late-March 2020, but certainly knew by 1 May. Maduro confirmed that he knew of the plan by the evening of 1 May, and said that it had been initially planned for 10 March, but postponed due to the COVID-19 pandemic. By the time of the attack, many of the mercenaries had abandoned their camps following the arrest of Alcalá, investigations by Colombian authorities, and the growing pandemic. It has been suggested that Goudreau went ahead with the attack despite its poor planning because he was seeking the US$15 million reward that the US government placed on Maduro.

Attack 

On 3 May, Diosdado Cabello, president of the National Constituent Assembly and vice-president of the ruling United Socialist Party of Venezuela (PSUV), released a statement indicating that the government had "received information that there was going to be an attack on Venezuela by sea; some people in boats attempted it, an action which was repelled by our security agencies on the beaches of Macuto, with an unfortunate tally of eight deceased, two detained people who were there; a lot of significant weapons, in addition to vehicles that they had ready to carry out actions directly on institutions and authorities."

The boats had launched from Colombia at 17:00 the day before in two waves, with many of the soldiers experiencing motion sickness and vomiting while at sea. According to Venezuelan state intelligence, the first boat, which was smaller and faster, arrived at Macuto, and the second boat arrived at Chuao in Aragua state. The Venezuelan military reported that the mercenaries had "war materials" on their boats. The naval attack force was composed of 60 soldiers, including two former United States Army Special Forces members employed as private military contractors for Silvercorp USA.

An initial fight in the early morning of 3 May involved the first boat and the Venezuelan Navy. Goudreau said that the second boat, yet to arrive at Venezuela, was running low on fuel at this point, but that refueling boats were sent from Aruba to help the incursion force. In the initial fight, eight mercenaries were arrested on the shore. Another six were killed on the beach; this had initially been reported as eight. Goudreau said that he had safe houses along the coast for his men. Videos of the fight, including gunshots, were shared on social media; the Venezuelan government first acknowledged the attack at 07:30, in an announcement from Interior Minister Néstor Reverol. One of the men killed was former Venezuelan army captain Robert "Pantera" Colina.

Goudreau and former Venezuelan National Guard officer Javier Nieto Quintero released a video in the afternoon taking responsibility, calling the attack "Operation Gideon" and explaining that they intended to launch an army into Venezuela to overthrow Maduro and his allies. Goudreau posted updates to Twitter shortly before and during the operation, saying that in addition to the naval attack, his forces had entered Venezuela by land and were still operating. In reality, Goudreau and Nieto Quintero posted their video from the safety of their homes in Florida. Speaking on national television that day, Reverol said that the Venezuelan military's defensive operation was ongoing, and would be for several days.

The second wave arrived on 4 May, but was intercepted by the navy and local police; the attackers were all captured. Two other suspects were detained in Puerto La Cruz later that day. Venezuelan Defense Minister Vladimir Padrino López later said that one of the landing boats had been sunk by the navy, and the country's military sent ships to look for survivors.

Aftermath, indictments and arrests 

On 4 May, Maduro said Venezuelan forces had detained 13 mercenaries, including two Americans working with Goudreau; Airan Berry and Luke Denman. Goudreau said that eight of his soldiers had been captured on 4 May, the two Americans and six Venezuelans, and that an unknown number had been captured on 3 May. Goudreau gave an interview by telephone from Florida to a reporter from the Associated Press on 4 May. Goudreau said that his intention in launching the raid was to "introduce a catalyst", acknowledging that it is impractical to believe "60 guys can come in and topple a regime". Despite the long odds, Goudreau expressed his belief that "60 guys can go in and inspire the military and police to flip and join in the liberation of their country, which deep down is what they want."

It was reported that "dozens" of mercenaries had been captured on 5 May. Regarding the detainees, Goudreau told the AP, "I've tried to engage everybody I know at every level ... Nobody's returning my calls. It's a nightmare." Another three mercenaries were arrested on 6 May. Seized items from the mercenaries included weapons and uniforms embroidered with an American flag. Venezuelan Prosecutor General Tarek William Saab later announced that 25,000 national troops were mobilized in a Venezuelan military mission named "Bolivarian Shield" (Spanish: Escudo Bolivariano) to protect the country from similar attempts.

Robert Colina Ybarra (alias Pantera or "Panther"), the former captain alleged to have directed one of the training camps in Riohacha, was killed in action. Adolfo Baduel, son of former Chávez Defense Minister, Raúl Baduel, was among the detainees.

By 6 May, the Defense Minister announced an additional three arrests via his Twitter account, publishing a photo of the purported detainees with pixelated faces on their knees with their wrists zip-tied together without disclosing the names or any other additional details regarding the accused. The same day, Trump announced his intent to appoint James B. Story as Ambassador of the United States to Venezuela.

Former Captain Javier Nieto Quintero, one of the organizers of the operation, said on 7 May that the events were only an "advanced tactical reconnaissance" and that the Carive group had 3,000 troops. The Venezuelan Operational Zone of Integral Defense (Zodi) of La Guaira announced that Russian Special Operations Forces were assisting Venezuelan soldiers with surveillance from unmanned aerial vehicles, saying that they carried a joint inspection of the facilities of Maiquetia Airport where they made a technical evaluation that showed it was not possible to operate the equipment from here because there were obstacles. However, the announcement was deleted afterwards.

Among the seized equipment, there was an airsoft gun and seven condoms.

United States federal authorities opened an investigation on Goudreau for arms trafficking.

The Colombian government informed that on 2 September it had arrested four Venezuelans related to Operation Gedeon. Óscar Pérez denounced in 2017 that both Rayder Alexander Russo (alias "Pico") and Osman Alejandro Tabosky, both arrested by Colombian officials and the latter also accused as intellectual author of the 2018 Caracas drone attack, were "infiltrated agents" in the resistance movement against Maduro.

In October, opposition deputy Wilmer Azuaje submitted a report to the International Criminal Court, which included 164 forensic photographs taken by the Venezuelan Scientific, Penal, and Criminal Investigation Service Corps (CICPC), that argues and concludes that after the operation was infiltrated by the Maduro investigation, there was not an armed confrontation and that the "victims were tortured and extrajudicially executed". Azuaje also submitted the report to the European Parliament.

Goudreau would later say that the Trump administration had knowledge of the operation before starting and even that the plotters held meetings in the Trump Doral west of Miami. Goudreau sued J. J. Rendón in October in a $1.4 million breach-of-contract lawsuit.

In May 2021, three Venezuelans were sentenced in Colombia to six years in prison for their relation to the operation.

Luke Denman 

On 6 May, Nicolás Maduro held a virtual press conference broadcast on state television in which he presented portions of Luke Denman's interrogation. In introducing the video, Maduro said that both Americans had "confessed, and we will ensure that justice is done and the truth surfaces". In the video, Denman states that his instructions were to seize Simón Bolívar International Airport in Maiquetía and fly Maduro to the United States, which Maduro cited as proof that the orders came directly from United States president Donald Trump. The video shows Denman answering questions that were asked in English, also indicating that he was hired through Goudreau and that they trained 50 combatants in Colombia in January 2020.

Ephraim Mattos, a Navy SEAL who had visited the rebel training camps in Colombia but was not involved in the operation, noted that Denman made an unusual and exaggerated gesture with his eyes during his recorded interrogation, noting that it may have been a covert signal, that "special operation soldiers are trained to find creative ways to discredit any propaganda videos they are forced to make if captured by the enemy" and that the odd eye movement immediately after saying Trump was Goudreau's boss is "a clear sign from Luke that he is being forced".

Denman, who was 34 years old at the time of the incident, is a former Army Special Forces communications sergeant who left the Army in December 2011. During his five years in the Army, Denman was trained in field medicine and deployed to Iraq at least once. Texas Monthly wrote that after his separation from the Army, Denman "seemed, like many combat veterans, to be unable to find excitement and meaning in post-military life, missing his closest buddies and the fulfilling ideal of service to country". He had worked jobs as a security guard, and then as an offshore welder out of Louisiana before moving to Oregon in the fall of 2019. Denman's home town is Austin, Texas.

Denman reportedly believed the United States government backed the naval attack. Denman's childhood friend, Daniel Dochen, told The Wall Street Journal that Denman believed the operation had personal approval from President Trump. A lifelong friend of Denman also reported that Denman indicated in October 2019 that one of his friends from the military was in the process of obtaining government approval for training operations or operations aimed at paving the way for more substantial engagement by the United States government.

Denman reportedly told his father "that he had a job offer in Florida that he couldn't talk about", though he did not disclose it had anything to do with Venezuela. He did say, however, that "it was the most meaningful thing he's ever done". Denman's mother told reporters that she "had no idea" of his intention to participate in a military operation in Colombia. Similarly, Luke's girlfriend since 2014, told the Military Times she was unaware of the planned operation. Denman's girlfriend reported she "didn't know very much, other than Luke trusted [Goudreau] and that he had a job opportunity with him".

In the weeks following the attack, Luke's brother, Mark Denman, an attorney, took on the task of advocating for the release of both Luke Denman and Airan Berry.

Airan Berry 
Airan Berry, who was 41 years old at the time of the raid, was a special forces engineer sergeant in the Army from 1996 to 2013. Berry deployed to Iraq in from March to June 2003, from November 2004 to June 2005, and from February 2007 to March 2007. During his career, he obtained a multitude of decorations and designations, including the Ranger tab, the Parachutist Badge, and the Special Operations Diver and Diving Supervisor Badges. Berry was also subject to interrogation which was videotaped and presented in parts on state television on 7 May, during a press release presented by the Vice President of Communication, Tourism, and Culture, Jorge Rodríguez, from Miraflores Palace. Venezuela's state-run media aired footage of Berry saying that the operation's planners met with Elkin Javier López Torres, whom the Maduro government described as a "drug trafficker". During his interrogation, Berry said that he was to advise the capture of an airport and the extraction of Maduro along with his officials. The video ends with Berry showing a document allegedly signed by Guaidó and Goudreau.

Berry is married to his wife of 19 years, Melanie, who is German-American. In the aftermath of the event, among the identity documents exhibited on television by Maduro's officials was a driver's license issued to Berry in Schweinfurt, Germany, where Berry, his wife, and two children lived since 2013. Berry's home town is Fort Worth, Texas, where his father lives. Berry also had previously made several social media posts in support of QAnon, a far-right conspiracy theory centered on U.S. President Donald Trump that has been linked to several violent incidents.

Criminal charges and extradition requests 
On 8 May, the Attorney General appointed by the Constituente Assembly, Tarek William Saab, announced that Luke Alexander Denman and Airan Berry would face charges for terrorism, conspiracy, "illicit trafficking of weapons of war" and "(criminal) association". These charges carry a maximum prison sentence of 25 to 30 years. Saab also announced that his office requested arrest warrants for Jordan Goudreau, Juan José Rendón, and Sergio Vergara. Speaking on state television, he said that the three persons were involved in the "design, financing and execution of this war action against the territory, the authorities and the people of Venezuela". He elaborated that "given that they are outside the country, we will request their inclusion in the Interpol system, as well as their extradition to Venezuelan territory."

William Saab announced on 15 May 2020 an arrest warrant against Popular Will politician Yon Goicoechea. Goicoechea rejected the accusations of any involvement with Operation Gideon, and accused Maduro's administration of paying and leading the uprising attempt to victimize itself and "persecute political dissent".

On 16 May 2020, according to a press release published by Venezuela's highest court, several trial courts dedicated to terrorism-related crimes ordered that some 40 individuals alleged to have participated in the raid be remanded to preventive detention. Antonio Sequea Torres was also in pretrial confinement and charged with commission of aggravated intentional homicide in connection with his alleged attempt to assassinate Maduro. The Supreme Tribunal of Justice also indicated that most of those involved in the operation are alleged to have committed the crimes of treason, rebellion, arms trafficking, criminal conspiracy, and colluding with a foreign government. Local newspaper El Pitazo reported that the mother of one of the accused had demanded assurance that her son was alive after receiving a phone call from her son requesting his brother's telephone number "so that they would stop torturing him".

Five individuals who have been accused by the Maduro administration of participation in the operation, including the two detained American mercenaries, had not been publicly charged as of 16 May.

State television aired an additional video of Airan Berry on 18 May, in an orange jumpsuit, answering questions about the planning of the raid. According to Berry's videotaped statement, Antonio Sequea Torres and the drug trafficker Elkin Javier López, better known as Doble Rueda [], also referred to as la silla [] – met multiple times during the planning period of the operation in order to coordinate logistics. The estate of López Torres in the Colombian Guajira is alleged to be the point of departure for the two boats involved in the raid. The Valledupar-based López Torres was arrested in December 2019 and his extradition was requested by the United States.

An additional interrogation video depicting Luke Denman in an orange jumpsuit was also aired on state television on 18 May 2020. In the video, Luke indicates that his objective in embarking on the operation, as relayed by Jordan Goudreau, was to arrive in Colombia to train Venezuelans, accompany them to Venezuela for the landing, and once the Venezuelan dissidents' objectives had been achieved, "put Maduro on a plane", and provide support at the airport in order that humanitarian aid could arrive.

As of 21 May, 66 arrests took place and 99 arrests warrants had been issued, 63 of which remained outstanding.

Terrorism charges 
Venezuelan Attorney General Tarek William Saab put forth a request to the Supreme Tribunal of Justice to declare Guaidó's political party Popular Will a terrorist group due to the attempted sea incursion. Saab's request asked for the tribunal "to determine if the Voluntad Popular political organization is a terrorist organization". Guaidó responded to the charges, stating that Maduro defends "irregular groups" like the National Liberation Army and the Revolutionary Armed Forces of Colombia."

Sentences  
After Luke Denman and Airan Berry, admitted to "conspiracy, association (to commit crimes), illicit trafficking of war weapons and terrorism" a Venezuelan court sentenced the two to 20 years in prison for their part in the attack aimed at overthrowing President Nicolás Maduro. The sentencing took place on 6 August 2020.

Maduro government response 
The Los Angeles Times wrote that "For Venezuelan President Nicolás Maduro, it's the propaganda gift that keeps on giving, buoying a leader long in Washington's crosshairs" and that the failed operation "quickly became a Maduro rallying cry, a Bay of Pigs in miniature, complete with a pair of captured U.S. gunmen". Human Rights Watch criticized Maduro for alleging that the human rights NGO PROVEA had connections to the United States Central Intelligence Agency after the organization called for due process of the captured militants. Human Rights Watch wrote: "An international community that's closely watching what happens in Venezuela needs to send the message loud and clear: subjecting human rights defenders to politically motivated prosecution, detention or other abuses would be crossing a line for which those responsible will have to answer".

Reactions

Domestic

Maduro government 
The Maduro administration accused the United States and Colombian governments of masterminding the attack, which both denied. Goudreau has also denied receiving any help for his operation from US and Colombian authorities. Vice President Delcy Rodríguez called Goudreau "a supremacist fanatic" and warned that "the Venezuelan women are waiting for you, for free, but with deep homeland passion."

Foreign Minister Jorge Arreaza criticized foreign governments and international organizations for their "deafening silence in the face of the mercenary aggression against Venezuela" and said that "the same people who always condemn us immediately based on biased or false information, today remain silent in the face of such a serious and full case of evidence." He added that "all those involved in the armed aggression against Venezuela confess that they trained in Colombia, with the knowledge of the Bogotá government and the financing of drug traffickers from that country."

Luis Parra, the president of the pro-Maduro National Assembly, stated "Deputy Juan Guaidó must give an explanation to the parliament and the country, about his alleged participation in Operation Gideon, according to the testimonies of those involved in it and the contract with his alleged signature" and said that his National Assembly would investigate Guaidó regarding the allegations.

Opposition 
Juan Guaidó has accused the Maduro administration of "trying to create a state of apparent confusion, an effort to hide what's happening in Venezuela", citing recent events like the gasoline shortages, the Guanare prison riot, a violent gang battle in Caracas, and the COVID-19 pandemic in Venezuela. Guaidó also demanded that the human rights of the detainees be respected.

Iván Simonovis, security and intelligence commissioner for the Guaidó administration, stated that the events in Macuto would be used by the Maduro government as a pretext to harass opponents and intensify repression, saying that Guaidó's administration would investigate the events and clarify its details. According to J. J. Rendón, the operation was compromised for months and that intelligence gathered by the Maduro government allowed the Venezuelan armed forces to set the militants up for an ambush, in order to create a "montage" of the events.

The opposition political party Justice First demanded that Guaidó immediately dismiss the officials involved with the plot and charged that they "used his government's name for individual purposes". Julio Borges, Guaidó's foreign minister, called for the dismissal of all officials related to the plot, stating "we worry that energies are put into the creation of a bureaucratic caste and not into political change." According to a Guaidó aide, the two officials "sacrificed themselves" in order to prevent "further embarrassment" towards the opposition.

NGOs 
The human rights NGO PROVEA asked about the well-being of the people arrested in Macuto and in Chuao and indicated that the Attorney General appointed by the Constituent Assembly, Tarek William Saab, and the Ombudsman appointed by Maduro, Alfredo Ruiz, would be responsible for possible forced disappearances or torture of the detainees, while stressing that it would only support and promote peaceful and constitutional means that lead to the "restoration of democracy in the country". Maduro accused PROVEA of being "financed by the CIA" and giving coverage to "terrorists" as a response, accusations that PROVEA rejected.

The Futuro Presente Foundation was accused by Maduro's administration of financing the operation. Futuro Presente categorically rejected the accusations of the participation of the organization and any of its members, alleged they were being persecuted, asked for it to end, and said that it was based on "completely false and unfounded accusations".

International 

: The Colombian government rejected the accusations, calling them an attempt by the "dictatorial regime of Nicolás Maduro" to divert attention from problems in the country. President Iván Duque Márquez said that he did not sponsor invasions or tricks in response to the accusations and stated "I do things up front because I am a defender of democracy."
: The Russian Foreign Ministry said that United States' denial was "unconvincing" and pointed to earlier warnings made by the Trump administration that "all options" are on the table, including the possibility of military action. It also said that the actions of the mercenaries deserve "unequivocal and decisive condemnation". 
On 20 May 2020, Russia convoked a virtual open debate of the United Nations Security Council (UNSC) for the purpose of urging the members of the council to condemn the attack as a threat to peace in Venezuela and to security in the region. The United States doubled down on its previous denials of any involvement in the operation, and accused the Maduro government of using the event as a pretext to persecute political dissidents and distract from other problems in Venezuela. Russia reasserted its assessment that the statements by the United States government that it had no knowledge of the operation were dubious in light of the attackers' plans to fly their captives to the United States. Russia's U.N. ambassador, Dmitry Polyansky, asked how does the attack correlate with the "all options are on the table" messages.
: Various US officials (including President Trump) have denied the accusations made by the Maduro administration.
President Donald Trump said that the incident "has nothing to do with our government". Speaking on Fox News, Trump said "If I wanted to go into Venezuela, I wouldn't make a secret about it" and said that the operation would be called an "invasion" if he sends an army into Venezuela.
Secretary of State Mike Pompeo said that there was no US government direct involvement in this operation and added: "[If] we'd have been involved, it would have gone differently." Regarding the detention of two Americans, Pompeo said that the US will use "every tool" available to secure the return of Americans if they are being held in Venezuela.
Secretary of Defense Mark Esper told reporters at the Pentagon that "the United States government had nothing to do with what's happened in Venezuela in the last few days."
A State Department spokesperson said that Maduro government has been consistent in its use of misinformation in order to shift focus from its mismanagement of Venezuela. It also said that there was "little reason to believe anything that comes out of the former regime".

See also 

Machurucuto incident
Attack on Fort Paramacay
Caracas helicopter incident
Colombia–Venezuela relations
El Junquito raid
Golpe Azul
2018 Caracas drone attack
 2019 Venezuelan uprising attempt
Operation Red Dog

References

2020 crimes in South America
2020 in international relations
2020 in Venezuela
Battles in 2020
Colombia–Venezuela relations
Conflicts in 2020
Covert operations
Crisis in Venezuela
Diplomatic incidents
Insurgencies in South America
International maritime incidents
May 2020 crimes in South America
May 2020 events in Venezuela
Naval battles involving Venezuela
Political repression in Venezuela
Rebellions in Venezuela
United States–Venezuela relations
Venezuelan presidential crisis
Violence in Venezuela
Violent non-state actor incidents in South America